Mindplayers is a 1987 first novel by science fiction author Pat Cadigan.

Plot summary
A dare goes awry when Ali tries on a stolen madcap and is afflicted with psychotic delusions that will not go away. "Cured" by a mindplayer, Ali is soon forced to become one herself or face a prison sentence as a "mind criminal."

Reception
Analog Science Fact & Fiction said of Mindplayers and Cadigan, "Excellent stuff, perceptive, imaginative, subtle and penetrating. A  pleasure to read, and a writer to admire." Fantasy Review called the novel "an energetic, intriguing, darkly humorous head-trip  extravaganza." The novel was nominated for a Philip K. Dick Award in 1988.

J. Michael Caparula reviewed Mindplayers in Space Gamer/Fantasy Gamer No. 82. Caparula commented that "the individual scenes and characters are memorable, especially black-marketeer Jerry Wirehammer. Mindplayers comes off as a blueprint for a better novel, one that is hopefully in the works."

References

1987 American novels
1987 science fiction novels
Cyberpunk novels
Fiction about mind control
Fiction about brain-to-brain communication
Debut science fiction novels
1987 debut novels
Bantam Spectra books